Alexandru is the Romanian form of the name Alexander. Common diminutives are Alecu, Alex, and Sandu.

Origin
Etymologically, the name is derived from the Greek "Αλέξανδρος" (Aléxandros), meaning "defending men"  or "protector of men", a compound of the verb "ἀλέξω" (alexō), "to ward off, to avert, to defend" and the noun "ἀνδρός" (andros), genitive of "ἀνήρ" (anēr), "man". It is an example of the widespread motif of Greek (or Indo-European more generally) names expressing "battle-prowess", in this case the ability to withstand or push back an enemy battle line.

The earliest attested form of the name is the Mycenaean Greek feminine noun a-re-ka-sa-da-ra, (transliterated as Alexandra), written in Linear B syllabic script.

The name was one of the titles ("epithets") given to the Greek goddess Hera and as such is usually taken to mean "one who comes to save warriors". In the Iliad, the character Paris is known also as Alexander. The name's popularity was spread throughout the Greek world by the military conquests of King Alexander III, commonly known as "Alexander the Great".

Rulers
(in chronological order)
Alexandru cel Bun (d.1432), Prince of Moldavia 1400-1432
Alexandru I Aldea (1397-1436), Prince of Wallachia 1431-1436
Alexandru Lăpuşneanu Prince of Moldavia 1552-1561 and 1564-1568
Alexandru II Mircea, Hospodar of Wallachia 1568-1574 and 1574-1577
Alexandru Ghica, Prince of Wallachia 1766-1768
Alexandru Suţu (1758-1821), Prince of Moldavia and Prince of Wallachia
Alexandru II Ghica (1796-1862),  Prince of Wallachia
Alexandru Ioan Cuza (1820-1873), Prince of Moldavia, Domnitor of the United Principalities of Wallachia and Moldavia 1859-1866

Prime ministers
Alexandru Athanasiu
Alexandru Averescu
Alexandru G. Golescu
Alexandru Marghiloman
Alexandru Vaida-Voevod

Religious leaders
Alexandru Sterca-Șuluțiu
Alexandru Șafran
Alexandru Todea

Other people
Alexandru Antemireanu
Alexandru Antoniuc
Alexandru Apolzan
Alexandru Balaban
Alexandru Baltagă
Alexandru Batcu
Alexandru Bogdan-Pitești
Alexandru Borza
Alexandru Candiano-Popescu
Alexandru Cantacuzino (militant)
Alexandru Cantacuzino (minister)
Alexandru Caraman
Alexandru Cecal
Alexandru Ștefan Catargiu
Alexandru Cernat
Alexandru Ciucurencu
Alexandru Ciura
Alexandru Ciurcu
Alexandru Claudian
Alexandru C. Constantinescu
Alexandru Dabija
Alexandru Darie
Alexandru Davila
Alexandru Dimca
Alexandru Dincă (journalist)
Alexandru Dobriceanu
Alexandru Dobrogeanu-Gherea
Alexandru Dragomir
Alexandru Epureanu
Alecu Filipescu-Vulpea
Alexandru Frim
Alexandru Froda
Alexandru Gațcan
Alexandru Ghiban
Alexandru Ghika
Alexandru Giugaru
Alexandru Golban
Alexandru Graur
Alexandru Greab
Alexandru Groapă
Alexandru Hrisoverghi
Alexandru Ioanițiu
Alexandru Koller
Alexandru Leșco
Alexandru Ioan Lupaș
Alexandru Macedonski
Alexandru Marin
Alexandru Mironescu
Alexandru Moghioroș
Alexandru Ioan Morțun
Alexandru Moşanu
Alexandru Nicolschi
Alexandru Odobescu
Alexandru Orăscu
Alexandru Paleologu
Alexandru Papadopol
Alexandru Papadopol-Calimah
Alexandru Papiu Ilarian
Alexandru Pastia
Alexandru Pesamosca
Alexandru Philippide
Alexandru A. Philippide
Alexandru Plămădeală
Alexandru Popovici (Moldovan footballer)
Alexandru Adrian Popovici
Alexandru Proca
Alexandru Repan
Alexandru Sahia
Alexandru Sătmăreanu
Alexandru Săvulescu (architect)
Alexandru Șerbănescu
Alexandru Șoltoianu
Alexandru Sturdza
Alexandru Suciu
Alexandru A. Suțu
Alexandru Terheș
Alexandru Toma
Alexandru Tudor-Miu
Alexandru Tudose
Alexandru Tyroler
Alexandru Usatiuc-Bulgăr
Alexandru Vulpe
Alexandru Dimitrie Xenopol
Alexandru Zaharescu
Alexandru Zub

People with the surname
Constantin Alexandru (1953–2014), Romanian sport wrestler
Iliaș Alexandru, Ruler of Moldova
Ioan Alexandru (1941–2000), Romanian poet and politician
Maria Alexandru (born 1939), Romanian table tennis player
Marian Alexandru (born 1977), Romanian footballer
Nicoleta Alexandru (born 1968), Romanian singer
Sadie Alexandru (born 1977), American actress and model
Valentin Alexandru (born 1991), Romanian footballer
Vasile Alexandru (born 1935), Romanian footballer

References

Romanian-language surnames
Romanian masculine given names